Applicative can refer to:
Applicative programming language
Applicative voice
Applicative functor